Araw Oras Tagpuan (Day Time Rendezvous) is the fourth studio album of the Pinoy rock band Sponge Cola under Universal Records. The album is composed of 12 tracks, it was released on September 16, 2011.
This is the first album to feature Tmac Cruz on drums.

Composition
The album is mainly composed of rock ballads "Kay Tagal Kitang Hinintay,""Regal," "Stargazer," "She Wants You To" and "Araw Oras Tagpuan."
The album features upcoming hip hop artists Ria Redulla and Los Magno, Salamin vocalist Paolo Valenciano, also Norma Love, Iwa Motor, and Mowmow. The collaboration with these artists adds hip hop, new metal, and retro to their music.
Lead vocalist Yael Yuzon written or co-written nine tracks from the album along with Gosh Dilay. The tenth track "Warning" from the album features band member Tedmark Cruz on lead vocals.

Album title
The album's title comes from the 12th track "Araw Oras Tagpuan" which means date, time, setting.

Singles
 "Tambay", the song was first released from the band's EP Tambay. The song's music video were released on April 19, 2011, and has already amassed over 2 million views.
 "Kay Tagal Kitang Hinintay", the song was first released from the band's 4th album.  The song's music video were released on December 21, 2011, and has already amassed over 1 million views. The song is all about a love ballad; about waiting for that perfect someone and when it comes; it also describes the amazement and disbelief that the girl has accepted the man. The video was shot in Negros Occidental.
 "She Wants You To" is the 5th single and the most obscure of all released tracks from this album. The song is the only song released as a radio and internet single and the only song with no music video. The song is quite somber in tone, particularly, it is a continuation and reverse of the story that had occurred in the lyrics of "Kay Tagal Kitang Hinintay". The song is also set in English, and is the reverse of the supposedly emotional meaning of the Tagalog lyrics of "Kay Tagal Kitang Hinintay". Because of its hidden nature and less exposure, the song is only known by a few people.

Track listing

Bonus Track

Personnel
Sponge Cola
Yael Yuzon - vocals, rhythm guitar
Gosh Dilay - bass guitar, backing vocals
Erwin Armovit - lead guitar
Tmac Cruz - drums, percussion, vocals in "Warning"

Release history

References

2011 albums
Sponge Cola albums